The Silver Line (Line 10) is an under construction line of Delhi Metro which is expected to be completed by September 2025.

This 23.622 km line consists of 15 stations (4 Elevated & 11 Underground) from Tughlakabad to Delhi Aerocity. This Line is a part of Phase 4 of Delhi Metro.

Stations 

The stations proposed for the Silver Line are:

In November 2020, DMRC changed the alignment of the Silver line as per the instructions of Archaeological Survey of India to circumvent the Qutub Minar and more than a hundred other historical structures in Mehrauli.

Train Info

References 

Delhi Metro lines